"Sad Songs (Say So Much)" is the closing track on English musician Elton John's eighteenth studio album Breaking Hearts, written by John and Bernie Taupin, released in 1984 as the lead single of the album. It reached No. 7 on the UK chart and No. 5 on the U.S. chart. The song reached the Top 10 of many countries except in Germany and Italy where it reached the Top 20. The single version of this song appeared on the 1990 box set To Be Continued... and various versions of the 2007 compilation Rocket Man: The Definitive Hits.

The lyrics describe how it sometimes helps for someone who is feeling sad, or who has lost a partner, to listen to old radio blues classics.

Music video
The music video, directed by Russell Mulcahy and shot on a street in Rushcutters Bay, Sydney, featured John without his familiar trademark glasses in some scenes. The single sleeve likewise featured John with no glasses. The song and the music video were both used in an early 1980s TV advertisement for Sasson Designer Jeans, altering the lyrics to "Sasson says so much."

Performances
John played this song on his concerts from 1984 to 1993 and then again in 2000 to present on rotation after he performed the song on One Night Only: The Greatest Hits Live at Madison Square Garden in October 2000 with Canadian rock star Bryan Adams. In 2013, John was joined by Rod Stewart in a special performance of the song at the London Palladium after being presented with the first Brits Icon award in recognition of his "lasting impact" on UK culture.

Personnel 
 Elton John – vocals, electric grand piano, synthesizers 
 Davey Johnstone – acoustic guitar, backing vocals
 Dee Murray – bass, backing vocals
 Nigel Olsson – drums, backing vocals

Chart performance

Weekly charts

Year-end charts

References

Elton John songs
1984 songs
1984 singles
Songs with music by Elton John
Songs with lyrics by Bernie Taupin
Song recordings produced by Chris Thomas (record producer)
Music videos directed by Russell Mulcahy
Songs about music
Songs about depression
Geffen Records singles
The Rocket Record Company singles